Rui Pedro Carvalho Vinhas (born 6 December 1986) is a Portuguese cyclist who last for UCI Continental team .

On 4 October 2022, he received a three-year ban by UCI for doping.

Major results
2016
 1st  Overall Volta a Portugal
2017
 2nd Road race, National Road Championships
 3rd Klasika Primavera
2019
 6th Overall Tour du Limousin

See also
 Doping in sport
 List of doping cases in cycling

References

External links

1986 births
Living people
Portuguese male cyclists
Volta a Portugal winners
People from Valongo
Sportspeople from Porto District
Doping cases in cycling